Shlomo Zilberstein (Hebrew: שלמה זילברשטיין; born 1960) is an Israeli-American computer scientist. He is a Professor of Computer Science and Associate Dean for Research and Engagement in the College of Information and Computer Sciences at the University of Massachusetts, Amherst. He graduated with a B.A. in Computer Science summa cum laude from Technion – Israel Institute of Technology in 1982, and received a Ph.D. in Computer Science from University of California at Berkeley in 1993, advised by Stuart J. Russell. He is known for his contributions to artificial intelligence, anytime algorithms, multi-agent systems, and automated planning and scheduling algorithms, notably within the context of Markov decision processes (MDPs), Partially Observable MDPs (POMDPs), and Decentralized POMDPs (Dec-POMDPs).

Research
His research is in the area of artificial intelligence, specifically automated planning, in addition to decision theory, reasoning under uncertainty, heuristic search, automated coordination and communication, and reinforcement learning.

He directs the Resource-Bounded Reasoning Laboratory at the University of Massachusetts, Amherst. In 2002, Daniel S. Bernstein, Robert Givan, Neil Immerman, and Shlomo Zilberstein introduced the Decentralized POMDP which extends the widely used single-agent POMDP model to a multi-agent scenario (Dec-POMDP). He has also developed AI algorithms for semi-autonomous systems with potential applications to semi-autonomous cars.

Service and awards
He served as editor-in-chief of the Journal of Artificial Intelligence Research and associate editor of the Journal of Autonomous Agents and Multi-Agent Systems. Additionally, he served as chair of the conference committee for both the Twenty-Ninth and Thirtieth AAAI Conference on Artificial Intelligence. The National Science Foundation awarded Dr. Zilberstein with the RIA, CAREER, and ITR awards. He was elected as a fellow of the Association for the Advancement of Artificial Intelligence in 2011 and of the Association for Computing Machinery in 2021.

Selected publications

References

External links
 Dr. Zilberstein's Academic Website
 Resource-Bounded Reasoning Laboratory website
 Decentralized Partially Observable Markov Decision Process (Dec-POMDP) overview, description, and publications within the field

1960 births
Living people
Artificial intelligence researchers
Technion – Israel Institute of Technology alumni
University of Massachusetts Amherst faculty
Fellows of the Association for the Advancement of Artificial Intelligence